The Buddha statue of Vasudeva I is a fragment of a statue of the Buddha, belonging to the art of Mathura, and bearing an inscription in the name of the Kushan Empire emperor Vasudeva I (191–232 CE).

The inscription on the base of a Buddha statue states: "In the 93rd year of Maharaja Devaputra Vasudeva...", corresponding to circa 171 CE, or more probably 220 CE, with the more recent definition of the Kanishka era as starting in 127 CE (127+93=220). The complete inscription reads:

The relatively peaceful reign of Vasudeva is marked by an important artistic production, in particular in the area of statuary. Several Buddhist statues are dated to the reign of Vasudeva, and are important markers for the chronology of Buddhist art. A partially preserved Sakyamuni statue, also from Mathura, has the date "Year 94", although without mentioning Vasudeva specifically. 

The statue, located in the Mathura Museum, is an important example of the art of Mathura.

See also
 Kushan art

References

Mathura art
Kushan Empire